Disarmament is the act of reducing, limiting, or abolishing weapons. Disarmament generally refers to a country's military or specific type of weaponry. Disarmament is often taken to mean total elimination of weapons of mass destruction, such as nuclear arms. General and Complete Disarmament was defined by the United Nations General Assembly as the elimination of all WMD, coupled with the “balanced reduction of armed forces and conventional armaments, based on the principle of undiminished security of the parties with a view to promoting or enhancing stability at a lower military level, taking into account the need of all States to protect their security.”

History
At the Hague Peace Conferences in 1899 and 1907 government delegations debated about disarmament and the creation of an international court with binding powers. The court was considered necessary because it was understood that nation-states could not disarm into a vacuum.  After World War I revulsion at the futility and tremendous cost of the war was widespread. A commonly held belief was that the cause of the war had been the escalating buildup of armaments in the previous half century among the great powers (see Anglo-German naval arms race). Although the Treaty of Versailles effectively disarmed Germany, a clause was inserted that called on all the great powers to likewise progressively disarm over a period of time. The newly formed League of Nations made this an explicit goal in the covenant of the league, which committed its signatories to reduce armaments 'to the lowest point consistent with national safety and the enforcement by common action of international obligations'.

One of the earliest successful achievements in disarmament was obtained with the Washington Naval Treaty. Signed by the governments of Great Britain, the United States, Japan, France, and Italy, it prevented the continued construction of capital ships and limited ships of other classification to under 10,000 tons displacement. The size of the three country's navies (the Royal Navy, United States Navy and Imperial Japanese Navy) was set at the ratio 5-5-3.

In 1921 the Temporary Mixed Commission on Armaments was set up by the League of Nations to explore possibilities for disarmament. It was made up not of government representatives but of famous individuals who rarely agreed.  Proposals ranged from abolishing chemical warfare and strategic bombing to the limitation of more conventional weapons, such as tanks.  A draft treaty was assembled in 1923 that made aggressive war illegal and bound the member states to defend victims of aggression by force. Since the onus of responsibility would, in practice, be on the great powers of the League, it was vetoed by Great Britain, who feared that this pledge would strain its own commitment to police its British Empire.
 

Another commission in 1926, set up to explore the possibilities for the reduction of army size, met similar difficulties. However acting outside the League. French Foreign Minister Aristide Briand and US Secretary of State Frank Kellogg drafted a treaty known as the Kellogg-Briand Pact, which denounced war of aggression. There were 65 signatories to the pact, but it set out no guidelines for action in the event of a war.  It was in 1946 used to convict and execute Nazi leaders of war crimes. 

A final attempt was made at the Geneva Disarmament Conference from 1932 to 1937, chaired by former British Foreign Secretary Arthur Henderson. Germany demanded the revision of the Versailles Treaty and the granting of military parity with the other powers, while France was determined to keep Germany demilitarised for its own security. Meanwhile, the British and Americans were not willing to offer France security commitments in exchange for conciliation with Germany. The talks broke down in 1933, when Adolf Hitler withdrew Germany from the conference.

Nuclear disarmament
 

Nuclear disarmament refers to both the act of reducing or eliminating nuclear weapons and to the end state of a nuclear-free world, in which nuclear weapons are completely eliminated.

In the United Kingdom, the Campaign for Nuclear Disarmament (CND) held an inaugural public meeting at Central Hall, Westminster, on 17 February 1958, attended by five thousand people. After the meeting a few hundred left to demonstrate at Downing Street.

CND's declared policies were the unconditional renunciation of the use, production of or dependence upon nuclear weapons by Britain and the bringing about of a general disarmament convention. The first Aldermaston March was organised by the CND and took place at Easter 1958, when several thousand people marched for four days from Trafalgar Square, London, to the Atomic Weapons Research Establishment close to Aldermaston in Berkshire, England, to demonstrate their opposition to nuclear weapons. The Aldermaston marches continued into the late 1960s when tens of thousands of people took part in the four-day marches.

In 1961, US President John F. Kennedy gave a speech before the UN General Assembly where he announced the US "intention to challenge the Soviet Union, not to an arms race, but to a peace race – to advance together step by step, stage by stage, until general and complete disarmament has been achieved." He went on to call for a global general and complete disarmament, offering a rough outline for how this could be accomplished:

Major nuclear disarmament groups include Campaign for Nuclear Disarmament, Greenpeace and International Physicians for the Prevention of Nuclear War. There have been many large anti-nuclear demonstrations and protests. On June 12, 1982, one million people demonstrated in New York City's Central Park against nuclear weapons and for an end to the cold war arms race. It was the largest anti-nuclear protest and the largest political demonstration in American history.  Following decades of campaigning the New Zealand government banned nuclear-armed and powered ships from entering the country’s territorial waters in 1984 with the ban later extended to cover land and airspace.

Police disarmament

The police disarmament movement is a political movement that advocates disarming police officers and law enforcement officers who regularly carry weaponry, such as those in the United States. Proposed police disarmament methods range from simply emphasizing de-escalation and less-lethal alternatives over lethal force; to limiting police access to firearms to specific units (such as police tactical units or authorised firearms officers) or to when authorized or necessary; to defunding or replacing police with other systems of public safety. The concept dates back to the 1900s and has historically been championed by anarchists and libertarians alike.

Proponents of police disarmament cite police brutality and militarization, safety and trust concerns, and the potential in other public safety apparatuses instead of armed police, as factors that make police disarmament ideal or necessary. Critics of police disarmament argue the concept is unrealistic, citing the need for police officers to defend themselves, the inability of unarmed public safety agents to effectively handle violent crime and terrorism, and the necessity of law enforcement to maintain society.

Disarmament conferences and treaties
1675: Strasbourg Agreement (1675)
1899: Hague Peace Conference
1919: Treaty of Versailles
1925: Locarno Treaties
1927: Kellogg-Briand Pact
1932–34: World Disarmament Conference
1960: Ten Nation Disarmament Committee
1962–1968: Eighteen Nation Disarmament Committee
1969–1978: Conference of the Committee on Disarmament
1979–present: Conference on Disarmament (CD)

Naval
 1908–1909: London Naval Conference
 1921–1922: Washington Naval Conference
 1927: Geneva Naval Conference
 1930: London Naval Conference leading to the London Naval Treaty
 1935: London Naval Conference leading to the Second London Naval Treaty

Weapons of Mass Destruction 

 1970: Non-Proliferation Treaty (NPT)
 1975: Biological Weapons Convention (BWC)
 1997: Chemical Weapons Convention (CWC)

Space

 1967: Outer Space Treaty

Definitions of disarmament
In his definition of "disarmament", David Carlton writes in the Oxford University Press political dictionary, "But confidence in such measures of arms control, especially when unaccompanied by extensive means of verification, has not been strengthened by the revelation that the Soviet Union in its last years successfully concealed consistent and systematic cheating on its obligations under the Biological Weapons Convention."  He also notes, "Now a freeze or a mutually agreed increase is not strictly speaking disarmament at all. And such measures may not even be intended to be a first step towards any kind of reduction or abolition. For the aim may simply be to promote stability in force structures. Hence a new term to cover such cases has become fashionable since the 1960s, namely, arms control."

References

Further reading
 Cuthbertson, Ian, and Peter ME Volten. The Guns Fall Silent: The End of the Cold War and the Future of Conventional Disarmament (Routledge, 2019).
 Dupuy, Trevor N., and Gay M. Hammerman, eds. A Documentary History of Arms Control and Disarmament (1973), 629 pp.
 Eloranta, Jari. "Why did the League of Nations fail?." Cliometrica 5.1 (2011): 27-52. online on League of Nations

 Feldman, Jonathan M.  "From the From Warfare State to 'Shadow State': Militarism, Economic Depletion and Reconstruction," Social Text, 91, Volume 25, Number 22 Summer, 2007.
 Kitching, Carolyn J. Britain and the Problem of International Disarmament: 1919–1934 (Routledge, 2003.)
 Marks, Sally. The Illusion of Peace: International Relations in Europe 1918–1933 (Macmillan, 2003).
 Melman, Seymour, ed. Inspection for Disarmament (New York: Columbia University Press, 1958).
 Myrdal, Alva.  The Game of Disarmament: How the United States and Russia run the arms race (New York: Pantheon, 1978).
Marcus G. Raskin. "Draft Treaty for a Comprehensive Program for Common Security and General Disarmament," in Essays of a Citizen: From National Security State to Democracy (Armonk, New York: M. E. Sharpe, Inc., 1991): 227–291.
 Wittner, Lawrence S.  Confronting the Bomb: A Short History of the World Disarmament Movement (Stanford University Press, 2009). 254pp online review

See also
Arms control
Arms embargo
Chemical weapons
Guns versus butter model
List of chemical arms control agreements
Military Keynesianism
Nuclear disarmament
Decommissioning of Russian nuclear-powered vessels
Peace dividend
United Nations Office for Disarmament Affairs

External links 
 United Nations Office for Disarmament Affairs
 EU Non-Proliferation and Disarmament eLearning Course
 Disarmament Insight Blogsite
 Organisation for the Prohibition of Chemical Weapons
  Archive of Related Writings, Seymour Melman Website
 Archive of Related Writings, Economic Reconstruction Website
 Armament and Disarmament, Stockholm International Peace Research Institute
 League of Nations conference listing
 "Naval conference", Columbia Encyclopedia

Arms control
 
Foreign policy doctrines